The second USS Teaser (SP-933) was a United States Navy patrol vessel in commission from 1917 to 1918.

Teaser was built as a civilian wooden-hulled cabin launch of the same name in 1916 by W. F. Dunn at Norfolk, Virginia. In November 1917, the U.S. Navy acquired her from her owner, George Roper & Brother, for use as a section patrol vessel during World War I. She was commissioned as USS Teaser (SP-933) on 29 November 1917.

Assigned to the 5th Naval District, Teaser served on patrol duties in the Hampton Roads, Virginia, area for the rest of World War I and into December 1918. On 27 December 1918, an engine backfire started a fire aboard Teaser, and she burned and sank in Hampton Roads.

Teaser was stricken from the Navy List on 15 February 1919.

References

Department of the Navy Naval History and Heritage Command Online Library of Selected Images: U.S. Navy Ships: USS Teaser (SP-933), 1917-1918. Originally the civilian motor boat Teaser (1916)
NavSource Online: Section Patrol Craft Photo Archive Teaser (SP 933)

Patrol vessels of the United States Navy
World War I patrol vessels of the United States
Ships built in Norfolk, Virginia
1916 ships
Maritime incidents in 1918
Shipwrecks of the Virginia coast
Ship fires